tert-Butanesulfinamide (also known as 2-methyl-2-propanesulfinamide or Ellman's sulfinamide) is an organosulfur compound and a member of the class of sulfinamides. Both enantiomeric forms are commercially available and are used in asymmetric synthesis as chiral auxiliaries, often as chiral ammonia equivalents for the synthesis of amines. tert-Butanesulfinamide and the associated synthetic methodology was introduced in 1997 by Jonathan A. Ellman et al.

Enantiopure synthesis
Enantiopure tert-butanesulfinamide can be prepared by enantioselective oxidation of inexpensive di-tert-butyl disulfide to the thiosulfinate followed by disulfide bond cleavage by lithium amide. In the original scope the chiral ligand used together with vanadyl acetylacetonate was prepared by condensing an optically pure chiral aminoindanol with 3,5-di-tert-butyl salicylaldehyde.

Enantioselective amine synthesis
Condensation with ketones and aldehydes yields the corresponding N-tert-butanesulfinyl aldimines and ketimines. These intermediates are more resistant to hydrolysis than other imines but more reactive towards nucleophiles. A nucleophile adds diastereoselectively over the imine group in an electrophilic addition with the tert-butanesulfinyl group acting as a chiral auxiliary. This tert-butanesulfinyl group is also a protecting group. On addition of hydrochloric acid the tert-butanesulfinyl group is removed, forming the chiral primary ammonium salt or amine (from aldehyde precursor) or the chiral secondary amine (ketone precursor).

Typical nucleophiles are Grignard reagents, organozinc compounds, organolithium compounds, and enolates.

Chiral sulfinimines as intermediates for the asymmetric synthesis of amines have also been developed by Franklin A. Davis.

Applications
tert-Butanesulfinamide has been used as an auxiliary in an asymmetric synthesis of cetirizine (more potent than the racemic mixture of the drug) starting from p-chlorobenzaldehyde and phenylmagnesium bromide, it can also be used in asymmetric synthesis of Rivastigmine from 3-Ethoxy-4-methoxybenzaldehyde.

References

Sulfinamides
Reagents for organic chemistry
Tert-butyl compounds